Àlex Corretja was the defending champion, but did not participate.

Nicolás Lapentti won the title, defeating Vince Spadea in the final 4–6, 6–4, 6–4.

Seeds
The top eight seeds received a bye into the second round.

Draw

Finals

Top half

Section 1

Section 2

Bottom half

Section 3

Section 4

References

External links
Main Draw

1999 ATP Tour